Platyptilia calodactyla is a moth of the family Pterophoridae found in Asia and Europe.  It was first described by the Austrian entomologists, Michael Denis & Ignaz Schiffermüller in 1775.

Description
The wingspan is 18–25 mm.

Platyptilia calodactyla differs from Platyptilia gonodactyla as follows : forewings with termen distinctly less sinuate, apical spot in cilia lighter and apex appearing less falcate, colour rather darker and more ochreous tinged, less strigulated with white, especially posteriorly.

Biology
Adults are single brooded and emerge in June and July.

The larvae feed in the stem of European goldenrod (Solidago virgaurea), Senecio nemorensis, heath groundsel (Senecio sylvaticus) and leopard's bane (Doronicum species), sometimes causing wilting of the leaves. Pupation takes place within the stem.

Distribution
It is found in most of Europe, except Portugal, Hungary, Romania, Ukraine and Greece. It has also been recorded from Iran.

References

External links
 microlepidoptera.nl

calodactyla
Moths of Asia
Moths of Europe
Moths described in 1775
Taxa named by Michael Denis
Taxa named by Ignaz Schiffermüller